Lobu Tua Inscription, also called Barus Inscription, is an inscription written in Tamil language which was discovered in 1873 in the village of Lobu Tua, Andam Dewi district of Central Tapanuli Regency, in North Sumatra Province, Indonesia. This inscription is dated 1010 Saka, or 1088 AD. This inscription was reported in the Madras Epigraphy Report of 1891-1892 by E. Hultzsch, an English epigraphist in India.

The inscription mentions the existence of a Tamil trade union in the Barus region. The trade union was named "The Five Hundreds of a Thousand Directions" (Disai-Ayirattu-Ainnurruvar). According to Prof. Y. Subbarayalu from Tamil University, Thanjavur, this trade union's other name was Ayyavole, which also left a Tamil-language inscription in Aceh. In Barus, they bought various commodities from the local population, and the members were collected excise in the form of gold, which was based on the price of the kasturi. The objects of the excise were the ship, the captain, and kevi. 

According to reports, in the 1900s a Buddha statue in the form of a torso made of red granite was also found in the site, which is now gone. The existence of the statue in Barus raises the suspicion that the Tamil community there was permanent or semi-permanent, therefore it has its own place of worship.

Currently 7/8 parts of the inscription are stored in the National Museum of Indonesia and another one eight part is still in Lobu Tua.  Beside inscriptions, in Lobu Tua some dry old cylindrical wells were found as well.

Inscription text 

The text of Lobu Tua Inscription is as follows:

 svasti sri cakarai
 antu ayirattu [p pa]
 ttuc cellani [n]
 ra macit tinkal
 varocana matan
 kari vallavat teci u
 yyak konta pat
 tinattu velapurattu
 kuti niranta te [cit ticai]
 vilanku ticai ayira
 ttainnurruvaro
 m nammakanar nakara senapa
 ti nattucetti
 yarkkum patinenbhumi
 teci apparkku ma[ve]t
 tukalukkum na vaittuk
 kututta paricavatu mara[ka]
 la... ... ...
 la marakkala nayunun kevi
 kalum kastu[ri] vilai mu[tala]kappa[ta]
 ancu tun [ta]yam ponnum ku[tu]
 ttup pavatai erakkatavatakavum
 ippatikku [i]kkal eluti natti
 k-kututtom patinenpumi tecit ticai vila
 nkuticai ayirattainnurruvarom a
 ramaraverka aramey tunai

1-4. Now, in 1010 Saka, the month of Masi

5-11. We, the Fifth Hundreds of a Thousand Directions, known in all countries and directions, have met in Valpuram in Varocu alias Matankari-vallava-teci-uyyakkonta-pattinam

12-17. Decided the following for "our son(s)" Nakara-senapati Nattucettiyar, Patinen-bhumi-teci-appar and mavettu:

18-22. [Each ... of] his ship, the skipper, and kevi will pay the ancu-tunt-ayam tax in the form of gold based on the price of the kasturi and [later] will walk on a stretch of cloth.

23-26. So, we the Five Hundreds of a Thousand Directions, known in all directions and in all eighteen countries have ordered to carve and stick this stone. Do not forget the kind attitude: the kind attitude itself is a good friend.

See also 
 Five Hundred Lords of Ayyavolu
 Tamil inscriptions in the Malay world
 Tamil Indonesians

Footnotes

References 

 
 
 
 
 

Tamil inscriptions in Indonesia
11th-century inscriptions
Tamil language